William Cooper Redd  (February 26, 1900 – January, 1986) was an athlete at the University of Chattanooga. He was an All-Southern center and player-coach on the basketball team, leading the team to a runner-up finish in the 1923 SoCon tournament. He was captain of the basketball and football teams in 1920. He also played baseball. He subsequently served as coach and athletic director, and organized Chattanooga's most successful professional basketball team, the Rail-Lites. He was inducted into the Tennessee Sports Hall of Fame in 1984.

References 

1900 births
1986 deaths
American football tackles
American football ends
Centers (basketball)
Chattanooga Mocs athletic directors
Chattanooga Mocs baseball players
Chattanooga Mocs football players
Chattanooga Mocs men's basketball players